National Tertiary Route 745, or just Route 745 (or ) is a National Road Route of Costa Rica, located in the Alajuela, Heredia provinces.

Description
In Alajuela province the route covers San Carlos canton (Pital district), Río Cuarto canton (Santa Rita, Santa Isabel districts).

In Heredia province the route covers Sarapiquí canton (La Virgen, Cureña districts).

References

Highways in Costa Rica